Martha Maria Cordeiro Vasconcellos  (born June 18, 1948) is a Brazilian beauty queen who became her country's second Miss Universe winner, after Ieda Maria Vargas first achieved the feat in 1963. She also became the fifth Latin American to win the title, after Peru's Gladys Zender in 1957, Colombia's Luz Marina Zuluaga in 1958 and Argentina's Norma Nolan in 1962. Vasconcellos is a native of the state of Bahia.

Biography
Vasconcellos allegedly had a boyfriend since she was twelve when she represented Brazil at the 1968 Miss Universe pageant in Miami Beach, Florida. She beat 64 contestants to win the title.

The morning after her win, she called her family and boyfriend in Brazil, expressing feelings of being homesick. Vasconcellos lived in New York, New York for the next year, as required by the Miss Universe organization, then returned to Brazil in 1969 and married days after.

Vasconcellos today leads a quiet and private life, practically disappearing from the public eye. She has two children from her first wedding to Reinaldo Loureiro: Leonardo and Leilane, and has two grandsons, Felipe and Guilherme. She lived in the Boston, Massachusetts area and worked for a Portuguese-speaking organization as a victims rights counselor.  Now retired, she has returned to live in Brazil.

See also
List of Brazilians

References

External links
page about Vasconcellos

1948 births
Brazilian emigrants to the United States
Living people
Miss Brazil winners
Miss Universe 1968 contestants
Miss Universe winners
People from Salvador, Bahia